The 1994–95 Western Kentucky Hilltoppers men's basketball team represented Western Kentucky University during the 1994–95 NCAA Division I men's basketball season. The Hilltoppers were led by Sun Belt Conference Coach of the Year Matt Kilcullen and SBC Player of the Year Chris Robinson.  The team won the Conference Championship and the Sun Belt Basketball tournament, earning a bid to the 1995 NCAA Division I men's basketball tournament for the third straight year.
Darrin Horn joined Robinson on the All Conference Team.  Robinson was the SBC Tournament MVP and Darius Hall and Jeff Rogers were named to the SBC All-Tournament team.

Schedule

|-
!colspan=6| Regular season

|-

|-
!colspan=6| 1995 Sun Belt Conference men's basketball tournament

|-
!colspan=6| 1995 NCAA Division I men's basketball tournament

References

Western Kentucky
Western Kentucky Hilltoppers basketball seasons
Western Kentucky
Western Kentucky Basketball, Men's
Western Kentucky Basketball, Men's